The women's 100 metres event at the 1967 Pan American Games was held in Winnipeg on 29 and 30 July.

Medalists

Results

Heats
Wind:Heat 1: +0.6 m/s, Heat 2: +0.7 m/s

Final
Wind: +0.1 m/s

References

Athletics at the 1967 Pan American Games
1967